New World Order is an online team-based tactical first-person shooter video game, similar to Counter-Strike. The game was developed by Termite Games, a Swedish game studio, and is powered by the DVA graphics engine.

Reception

The game received "generally unfavorable reviews" according to the review aggregation website Metacritic. GameSpot stated that it "fails in every imaginable way", and Eurogamer described it as "horrendously bad" and "a total farce".

References

External links
 

2002 video games
First-person shooters
Multiplayer online games
Video games about police officers
Video games about terrorism
Video games developed in Sweden
Windows games
Strategy First games